The Jarabulus Company was a Free Syrian Army-affiliated rebel group that was active during the Syrian Civil War.

The militia was a minor rebel group that fought the Islamic State of Iraq and the Levant during the Siege of Kobanî. The rebel group evolved from previous rebel groups in the town of Jarabulus, which became an ISIL stronghold in June 2013. An offensive by rebels to retake control of Jarabulus failed following a suicide bombing attack by the IS on 15 January 2014. According to a representative of the Northern Sun Battalion in Kobanî, Jarabulus Company initially operated in the city but has since lost their presence by late 2014.

See also
List of armed groups in the Syrian Civil War

References

Anti-government factions of the Syrian civil war
Anti-ISIL factions in Syria
Free Syrian Army